Dasyophthalma geraensis is a butterfly of the family Nymphalidae. It is found in Brazil (Minas Gerais: the Mantiqueira mountain range). The habitat consists of high elevation
forests (about 1,200 meters).

The larvae feed on Bactris tormentosa.

References

Butterflies described in 1922
Morphinae
Fauna of Brazil
Nymphalidae of South America